Ijira Tameike Dam is an earthfill dam located in Gifu Prefecture in Japan. The dam is used for irrigation. The catchment area of the dam is 5.4 km2. The dam impounds about 10  ha of land when full and can store 540 thousand cubic meters of water. The construction of the dam was started on 1958 and completed in 1966.

References

Dams in Gifu Prefecture
1966 establishments in Japan